Selma Bajrami (born 4 July 1980) is a Bosnian pop-folk singer. Her professional music career began when she was a teenager with the release of her first studio album Kad suza ne bude... in 1998.

Early life
Bajrami was born in Tuzla, Bosnia and Herzegovina, at the time part of SFR Yugoslavia to a Bosniak mother and Albanian father. She grew up in the nearby village of Mramor.

Bajrami spent the entirety of the Bosnian War (1992–1995) in Mramor, during which Bajrami first began singing in kafanas.In 1996 she moved to Tuzla

Career
In the beginning of her professional career, she was a member of a music group called If, which she later left.

Her first solo studio album, Kad suza ne bude..., was released in 1998 through the record label Nimfa Sound. The album was recorded in Belgrade and was, for the most part, written and composed by Milić Vukašinović.

Bajrami's second album Ljubav si ubio gade (1999), was produced by Mića Nikolić. Her third album Revolucija was released in 2001 was produced by Dejan Abadić and took on a different sound from her previous albums.

Žena sa Balkana (2002) was her fourth album. With multiple hit songs, Selma gained even greater popularity than before. The song "Žena sirena" became Selma's nickname.

The songwriters of her fifth album, Kakvo tijelo Selma ima (2004), included Dragan Brajović Braja, Dragiša Baša and Nanin from Tuzla. This album was the second one produced under Dejan Abadić.

Her sixth album, Ostrvo tuge (2007) was her first of two consecutive projects with the record label Grand Production.

Bajrami's seventh album was called Zakon sudbine, released in May 2010. The lead singles "Đavolica" and "Farmerice" were released in 2009. The "Farmerice" music video was filmed at a nightclub in Tuzla and premiered 24 December 2009.

2012–14: Selma Bajrami

Bajrami began work on her eighth studio album in 2012. The lead single "James Dean" premiered in December of that year. It was followed by "Nisam ti oprostila", "Moje milo", "Tijelo bez duše" and "Samo tvoje oči". The full album, Selma Bajrami was released 23 July 2014 through Hayat Production and City Records.

Personal life
Bajrami met her first husband, Zoran Vučković from Sarajevo, in March 2003 in the Croatian city of Makarska, where they married six months later. They divorced in February 2004.

Selma met her second husband, a Bosnian man named Mujo Musić in July 2011, during a performance of hers at the Modrac Lake by Lukavac. They were wed on 22 December 2011 in front of 100 guests at the hotel Tuzla in the same city, having been engaged a month. Bajrami moved with her second husband to his home in Vienna, Austria. The couple filed for divorce in October 2014.

Bajrami was about two months pregnant on her wedding day and although she had a birth due date of 4 July 2012, her 32nd birthday, she gave birth via caesarean section to a baby boy named Daris seven days later than expected on 11 July 2012 in Vienna.

Bajrami did not celebrate her son's first birthday in 2013 as he was born on the anniversary of the Srebrenica genocide. She has stated that she will never celebrate his birthday on that date out of respect for the victims. 
On 28 February 2010, Bajrami was attending a friends birthday party in Belgrade, when she was attacked and assaulted by a drunk man. She was treated in a hospital and sued her assailant. Earlier, Bajrami denied news in September 2008 that she had been attacked by a schizophrenic man with a chainsaw in a nightclub near Srebrenik.

Discography

Studio albums
Kad suza ne bude... (1998)
Ljubav si ubio gade (1999)
Revolucija (2001)
Žena sa Balkana (2002)
Kakvo tijelo Selma ima (2004)
Ostrvo tuge (2007)
Zakon sudbine (2010)
Selma (2014)

Singles with “Grupa IF”
Ne vjeruj muškarcima (1999)
Ne mogu bez tebe (2000)

Non-album singles
Zaljubljena (2003)
To vodu ne pije (2005) feat. Amir Kazić Leo
Gdje će ti duša (2006) feat. Enes Begović
Mlađe slađe (2015) feat. Enela Palavra
Zvjerka (2016)
Uzbuna (2016)
U zemlji krvi i meda (2016)
Sve mi nudi (2017) feat. Kexi
Incidentno (2017)
Rizik (2018)
Lažni gospodin (2019)
Neka gori ova noć (2021) feat. Belmin
Prva žena (2022)
Maska (2022)

Videography
Pijanico (1999)
Život liječi rane (1999)
Ljubav si ubio gade (1999) 
Moj golube (1999)
Ne vjeruj muškarcima with IF (1999)
Ne mogu bez tebe with IF (2000)
Tako sam mlada (2001)
Svi ste vi isti (2001)
Nana (2002)
Žena sirena (2002)
Kakvo tijelo Selma ima (2004)
Tijelo uz tijelo (2004)
To vodu ne pije (2005) feat. Almir Kazić Leo
Ostrvo tuge (2007)
Promijeni se (2007)
Farmerice (2009)
Šta je od Boga, dobro je (2009) feat. Elvir Mekić
Voli me do bola (2011)
Bakšiš (2011)
Nisam ti oprostila (2013)
Tijelo bez duše (2014)
Mlađe slađe (2015) feat. Enela Palavra
Zvjerka (2016)
U zemlji krvi i meda (2016)
Incidentno (2017)
Rizik (2018)
Lažni gospodin (2019)
Neka gori ova noć (2021) feat. Belmin
Prva žena (2022)
Maska (2022)

References

1980 births
Living people
Musicians from Tuzla
Bosniaks of Bosnia and Herzegovina
Bosnia and Herzegovina Muslims
21st-century Bosnia and Herzegovina women singers
Bosnia and Herzegovina people of Albanian descent
Bosnia and Herzegovina folk-pop singers
Grand Production artists
Hayat Production artists